Thermoclostridium  stercorarium is a cellulolytic thermophilic bacterium. It is anaerobic, spore-forming and saccharoclastic, with  cells being rod-shaped and 0.7 to 0.8 by 2.7 to 7.7 µm in size. Its genome has been sequenced.

References

Further reading

External links

LPSN
Type strain of Clostridium stercorarium at BacDive -  the Bacterial Diversity Metadatabase

Gram-positive bacteria
Bacteria described in 1983
Oscillospiraceae